"Let's Work" was the lead single from Mick Jagger's second solo album, Primitive Cool. Despite high expectations, it failed to reach the popularity of earlier Jagger singles such as "Just Another Night.", hitting No. 39 on the Billboard Hot 100 charts. The music video for the song featured Jagger running down a street with several collections of workers.

It was the only track from Primitive Cool included on Jagger's greatest hits album, The Very Best of Mick Jagger.

Chart performance

References

Songs written by David A. Stewart
1987 singles
Mick Jagger songs
Songs written by Mick Jagger
Music videos directed by Zbigniew Rybczyński
1987 songs
Songs about labor